Torlakian, or Torlak is a group of South Slavic dialects of southeastern Serbia, Kosovo, northeastern North Macedonia, and northwestern Bulgaria. Torlakian, together with Bulgarian and Macedonian, falls into the Balkan Slavic linguistic area, which is part of the broader Balkan sprachbund. According to UNESCO's list of endangered languages, Torlakian is vulnerable.

Torlakian is not standardized, and its subdialects vary significantly in some features. Yugoslav linguists traditionally classified it as an old Shtokavian dialect or as a fourth dialect of Serbo-Croatian along with Shtokavian, Chakavian, and Kajkavian. Bulgarian scholars classify it as a Western Bulgarian dialect, in which case it is referred to as a Transitional Bulgarian dialect. 

According to Ivo Banac, during the Middle Ages, Torlak and the Eastern Herzegovinian dialect were part of Eastern South Slavic, but since the 12th century, especially the Shtokavian dialects, including Eastern Herzegovinian, began to diverge from the other neighbouring South Slavic dialects. Some of the phenomena that distinguish western and eastern subgroups of the South Slavic languages can be explained by two separate migratory waves of different Slavic tribal groups of the future South Slavs via two routes: the west and east of the Carpathian Mountains.

Speakers of the dialectal group are primarily ethnic Serbs, Bulgarians, and Macedonians. There are also smaller ethnic communities of Croats (the Krashovani) in Romania and Slavic Muslims (the Gorani) in southern Kosovo.

Classification
The Torlakian dialects are intermediate between the Eastern and Western branches of South Slavic dialect continuum, and have been variously described, in whole or in parts, as belonging to either group. In the 19th century, they were often called Bulgarian, but their classification was contested between Serbian and Bulgarian writers. Previously, the designation "Torlakian" was not applied to the dialects of Niš and the neighbouring areas to the east and south.

Balkan sprachbund
The Torlakian dialects, together with Bulgarian and Macedonian, display many properties of the Balkan linguistic area, a set of structural convergence features shared also with other, non-Slavic, languages of the Balkans such as Albanian, Romanian  and Aromanian. In terms of areal linguistics, they have therefore been described as part of a prototypical "Balkan Slavic" area, as opposed to other parts of Serbo-Croatian, which are only peripherally involved in the convergence area.

Balkan linguists

Serbian linguists
Most notable Serbian linguists (like Pavle Ivić and Asim Peco) classify Torlakian  (Serbo-Croatian:  /) as an Old-Shtokavian dialect, referring to it as the Prizren–Timok dialect.

 Pavle Ivić, in his textbook of Serbo-Croatian dialectology (1956), treated the "Prizren–Timok dialect zone" as part of the overall Shtokavian zone.
 Aleksandar Belić classified the Prizren–Timok dialect as "fundamentally Serbian", as well as claimed that the Western Bulgarian dialects were Serbian.
 Dejan Krstić in his scientific paper "Ideas of the Pirot region population that concern the term the Torlaks" has claimed that the term Torlaks was and is used to refer to the bilingual Vlachs in Pirot area.

Croatian linguists
 Croatian linguist Milan Rešetar classified the "Svrljig dialect" (Torlak) as a different group from Shtokavian.

Bulgarian linguists
Bulgarian researchers such as Benyo Tsonev, Gavril Zanetov and the Macedono-Bulgarian researcher Krste Misirkov classified Torlakian as dialect of the Bulgarian language. They noted the manner of the articles, the loss of most of the cases, etc. Today Bulgarian linguists (Stoyko Stoykov, Rangel Bozhkov) also classify Torlakian as a "Belogradchik-Tran" dialect of Bulgarian, and claim that it should be classified outside the Shtokavian area. Stoykov further argued that the Torlakian dialects have a grammar that is closer to Bulgarian and that this is indicative of them being originally Bulgarian.

Macedonian linguists
In Macedonian dialectology, the Torlakian varieties spoken in North Macedonia (Kumanovo, Kratovo and Kriva Palanka dialect) are classified as part of a northeastern group of Macedonian dialects.

Features

Vocabulary
Basic Torlakian vocabulary shares most of its Slavic roots with Bulgarian, Macedonian and Serbian but also over time borrowed a number of words from Aromanian, Greek, Turkish, and Albanian in the Gora region of the Šar Mountains. It also preserved many words which in the "major" languages became archaisms or changed meaning. Like other features, vocabulary is inconsistent across subdialects, for example, a Krashovan does not necessarily understand a Goranac.

The varieties spoken in the Slavic countries have been heavily influenced by the standardized national languages, particularly when a new word or concept was introduced. The only exception is a form of Torlakian spoken in Romania, which escaped the influence of a standardized language which has existed in Serbia since a state was created after the withdrawal of the Ottoman Empire. The Slavs indigenous to the region are called Krashovani and are a mixture of original settler Slavs and later settlers from the Timok Valley in eastern Serbia.

Cases lacking inflections
Bulgarian and Macedonian are the only two modern Slavic languages that lost virtually the entire noun case system, with nearly all nouns now in the surviving nominative case. This is partly true of the Torlakian dialect. In the northwest, the instrumental case merges with the accusative case, and the locative and genitive cases merge with the nominative case. Further south, all inflections disappear and syntactic meaning is determined solely by prepositions.

Lack of phoneme /x/

The appearance of the letter h in the alphabet is reserved mostly for loanwords and toponyms within the Republic of North Macedonia but outside of the standard language region. In Macedonian, this is the case with eastern towns such as Pehčevo. In fact, the Macedonian language is based in Prilep, Pelagonia and words such as thousand and urgent are iljada and itno in standard Macedonian but hiljada and hitno in Serbian (also, Macedonian oro, ubav vs. Bulgarian horo, hubav (folk dance, beautiful)). This is actually a part of an isogloss, a dividing line separating Prilep from Pehčevo in the Republic of North Macedonia at the southern extreme, and reaching central Serbia (Šumadija) at a northern extreme. In Šumadija, local folk songs may still use the traditional form of I want being oću (оћу) compared with hoću (хоћу) as spoken in Standard Serbian.

Syllabic /l/
Some versions of Torlakian have retained the syllabic , which, like , can serve the nucleus of a syllable. In standard Bulgarian, it is preceded by the vowel represented by ъ to separate consonant clusters. Naturally, the  becomes velarized in most such positions, giving .
In some dialects, most notably the Leskovac dialect, the word-final -l has instead shifted into the vocal cluster -(i)ja; for example the word пекал became пекја (to bake). Word-medially however the syllabic /l/ remains unaltered.

Features shared with Eastern South Slavic
 Loss of grammatical case as in Bulgarian and Macedonian
 Loss of infinitive as in Bulgarian and Macedonian, present in Serbian
 Full retention of the aorist and the imperfect, as in Bulgarian
 Use of a definite article as in Bulgarian and Macedonian, lacking in Serbian
 ə for Old Church Slavonic ь and ъ in all positions: sən, dən (Bulgarian sən, den; Serbian san, dan;  Macedonian son, den), including in the place of OCS suffixes -ьцъ, -ьнъ (Bulgarian -ec, -en; Serbian -ac, -an;  Macedonian -ec, -en)
 Lack of phonetic pitch and length as in Bulgarian and Macedonian, present in Serbian
 Frequent stress on the final syllable in polysyllabic words, impossible in Serbian and Macedonian (Bulgarian že'na, Serbian žena)
 Preservation of final l, which in Serbian developed to o (Bulgarian and Macedonian bil, Serbian bio)
 Comparative degree of adjectives formed with the particle po as in Eastern South Slavic ubav, poubav, Serbian lep, lepši.
 Lack of epenthetic l, as in Eastern South Slavic zdravje/zdrave, Serbian zdravlje Use of što pronoun meaning what, as in Eastern South Slavic rather than šta as in standard Serbian (što also preserved in some Croatian dialects) and of the standard Bulgarian kakvo (often shortened to kvo).

Features shared with Western South Slavic
In all Torlakian dialects:
 ǫ gave rounded u like in Shtokavian Serbian, unlike unrounded ъ in literary Bulgarian and a in Macedonian
 vь- gave u in Western, v- in Eastern
 *čr gave cr in Western, but was preserved in Eastern
 Voiced consonants in final position are not subject to devoicing (Serbian grad (written and pronounced), Bulgarian/Macedonian pronounced  *vs stays preserved without metathesis in Eastern (S.-C. sve, Bulgarian vse, simplified in Macedonian to se)
 Accusative njega as in Serbian, unlike old accusative on O in Eastern (nego''')
 Nominative plural of nomina on -a is on -e in Western, -i in Eastern
 Ja 'I, ego' in Western, (j)as in Eastern
 Mi 'we' in Western, nie in Eastern
 First person singular of verbs is -m in Western, and the old reflex of *ǫ in Eastern
 suffixes *-itjь (-ić) and *-atja (-ača) are common in Western, not known in Eastern

In some Torlakian dialects:
 Distinction between the plural of masculine, feminine and neuter adjectives is preserved only in Western (S.C. beli, bele, bela), not in Eastern (beli for masc., fem. and neutr.), does not occur in Belogradchik area; in some eastern regions there is just a masculine and feminine form.
 The proto-Slavic *tj, *dj which gave respectively ć, đ  in Serbo-Croatian, št, žd in Bulgarian and ќ, ѓ in Macedonian, is represented by the Serbian form in the west and northwest and by the hybrid č, dž in the east: Belogradchik and Tran, as well as Pirot, Gora, northern Macedonia. The Macedonian form occurs around Kumanovo.

Dialects
 Prizren–Timok dialect
 Transitional Bulgarian dialects
 Kumanovo dialect
 Gora dialect
 Krashovani

Literature
Literature written in Torlakian is rather sparse as the dialect has never been an official state language. During the Ottoman rule literacy in the region was limited to Eastern Orthodox clergy, who chiefly used Old Church Slavonic in writing. The first known literary document influenced by Torlakian dialects is the Manuscript from Temska Monastery from 1762, in which its author, the Monk Kiril Zhivkovich from Pirot, considered his language "simple Bulgarian".

Ethnography
According to one theory, the name Torlak derived from the South Slavic word tor ("sheepfold"), possibly referring to the fact that Torlaks in the past were mainly shepherds by occupation. Some Bulgarian scientists describe the Torlaks as a distinct ethnographic group. Another theory is that it is derived from Ottoman Turkish torlak'' ("unbearded youth"), possibly referring to some portion of the youth among them not developing dense facial hair. The Torlaks are also sometimes classified as part of the Shopi population and vice versa. In the 19th century, there was no exact border between Torlak and Shopi settlements. According to some authors, during Ottoman rule, a majority of the Torlakian population did not have national consciousness in an ethnic sense.

Therefore, both Serbs and Bulgarians considered local Slavs as part of their own people and the local population was also divided between sympathy for Bulgarians and Serbs. Other authors take a different view and maintain that the inhabitants of the Torlakian area had begun to develop predominantly Bulgarian national consciousness. With Ottoman influence ever weakening, the increase of nationalist sentiment in the Balkans in late 19th and early 20th century, and the redrawing of national boundaries after the Treaty of Berlin (1878), the Balkan wars and World War I, the borders in the Torlakian-speaking region changed several times between Serbia and Bulgaria, and later the Republic of North Macedonia.

See also
 Balkan language area
 Gorani
 Krashovani
 Shopi
 Shtokavian dialect

Notes

References

Sources
 

 Стойков, Стойко: Българска диалектология, Акад. изд. "Проф. Марин Дринов", 2006.

External links
A Handbook of Bosnian, Serbian, and Croatian (by Wayles Brown and Theresa Alt)

Further reading
 
 

South Slavic languages
Dialects of Serbo-Croatian
Serbian dialects
Dialects of the Macedonian language
Dialects of the Bulgarian language